Aleksandr Ogorodnikov (born 8 September 1967) is a Russian former water polo player who competed in the 1992 Summer Olympics.

See also
 List of Olympic medalists in water polo (men)
 List of World Aquatics Championships medalists in water polo

References

External links
 

1967 births
Living people
Russian male water polo players
Olympic water polo players of the Unified Team
Olympic bronze medalists for the Unified Team
Olympic medalists in water polo
Water polo players at the 1992 Summer Olympics
Place of birth missing (living people)
Medalists at the 1992 Summer Olympics